La fidanzata di papà is a 2008 Italian comedy film directed by Enrico Oldoini.

Cast

References

External links

2008 films
Films directed by Enrico Oldoini
2000s Italian-language films
2008 comedy films
Italian comedy films
2000s Italian films